Tetracha pilosipennis is a species of tiger beetle that was described by Mandl in 1958.

References

Beetles described in 1958
Cicindelidae